The Arctic policy of Iceland refers to the foreign policy of Iceland in regard to the Arctic region.

Iceland is a member of the Arctic Council. Iceland does not agree that the Arctic five should meet separately, as they did at the Arctic Ocean Conference.

Policy statements
March 28, 2011, the Althing passed a resolution on Iceland's Arctic Policy including the following: Promoting and strengthening the Arctic Council; Securing Iceland as a coastal State within the Arctic; Promoting concept that the Arctic region extends both to the North Pole and to the closely connected North Atlantic area; Resolving differences in the Arctic using United Nations Convention on the Law of the Sea; Increasing cooperation with the Faroe Islands and Greenland to promote the interests of the three countries; Supporting the indigenous rights in the Arctic; Cooperating with other States and stakeholders on issues relating to Icelandic interests in the Arctic; Working to prevent human-induced climate change and its effects in order to improve the well-being of Arctic residents; Safeguarding broadly defined security interests through civilian means and working against all militarization of the Arctic; Increasing trade relations between Arctic States; Advancing Icelanders' knowledge of Arctic issues and promoting Iceland abroad as a venue for Arctic conferences; Increasing consultations and cooperation at the domestic level on Arctic issues.

Scientific research

Iceland conducts various kinds of scientific research in Arctic matters. An overview of institutions working on Arctic matters can be seen on the website on the Icelandic Arctic Cooperation Network.

See also 

International initiatives
Arctic Cooperation and Politics
Arctic Council
Arctic Environmental Protection Strategy
Arctic Ocean Conference
Arctic Search and Rescue Agreement
Territorial claims in the Arctic
United Nations Convention on the Law of the Sea
Nation states policies
Arctic policy of European Union
Arctic policy of China
Arctic policy of Russia
Foreign relations of Iceland
Arctic (section International cooperation and politics)
Arctic concepts and terms
Nordicity

References

External links 

Iceland
Foreign relations of Iceland